The Corsican Brothers (Spanish: Los Hermanos corsos) is a 1955 Argentine film.

Cast
 António Vilar

External links
 

1955 films
1950s Spanish-language films
Argentine black-and-white films
Films based on The Corsican Brothers
Argentine adventure films
1955 adventure films
1950s Argentine films
Films directed by Leo Fleider